Johnny Ray may refer to:

Johnny Ray (racing driver) (1937–2020), former NASCAR driver and team owner
Johnny Ray (outfielder) (1911–1957), American Negro league baseball player
Johnny Ray (second baseman) (born 1957), former second baseman for the Pittsburgh Pirates and California Angels
Johnny Ray (comedian), American actor of Puerto Rican descent
Johnny Ray (Latin singer), born Johnny Zamot, Puerto Rican Latin singer, see Ray Sepúlveda

See also
Johnny Rae (1934-1993), American jazz drummer and vibraphonist
Johnnie Ray (1927–1990), American singer-songwriter
John Ray (disambiguation)